The men's discus throw event at the 2017 European Athletics U23 Championships was held in Bydgoszcz, Poland, at Zdzisław Krzyszkowiak Stadium on 15 and 16 July.

Medalists

Results

Qualification
15 July

Qualification rule: 57.50 (Q) or the 12 best results (q) qualified for the final.

Final
16 July

References

Discus throw
Discus throw at the European Athletics U23 Championships